Brown Mountain is a low-lying ridge, approximately  long, in the Pisgah National Forest near Morganton, in western North Carolina, on the border of Burke and Caldwell Counties.

Since at least the early 20th century, mysterious illuminations known as the Brown Mountain lights have been seen there.

See also
List of mountains in North Carolina

References

Mountains of North Carolina
Mountains of Burke County, North Carolina
Protected areas of Caldwell County, North Carolina
Pisgah National Forest
Unexplained phenomena
Mountains of Caldwell County, North Carolina